The 1997-1998 French Championship of Rugby League concluded on  5 April 1998, with the Villeneuve Leopards as champions.

Final table

References

Rugby league competitions in France
French Championship season
French Championship season